The 1971 Odisha cyclone was a devastating tropical cyclone that struck the Indian state of Odisha (known as Orissa at the time) on October 29, 1971. The cyclone also affected the Indian state of West Bengal as well as East Pakistan (present-day Bangladesh), which had been devastated by the 1970 Bhola cyclone just less than a year prior and was in the middle of Bangladesh Liberation War.

Meteorological history

This tropical cyclone formed on October 26. Within few hours after its formation, due to presence of highly favorable conditions, the cyclone underwent rapid intensification which became an extremely severe cyclonic storm and Category 3 equivalent cyclone in one and ten minute mean windspeed on 29 October. At the time, the storm's central pressure was 966 hPa. At its peak intensity, the storm made landfall on the coast of Odisha near Paradip early on  the morning of October 30 and weakened the same day. It then curved northeast and dissipated on October 31.

Impact

The storm surge flooded low lying areas of the Odisha coast, resulting in more than 10,000 deaths and killing 50,000 cattle. Hundreds of thousands of trees were uprooted. The cyclone destroyed more than 800,000 houses. Communications and power lines were cut for days, pre venting news of the disaster from reaching the outside world. Coastal districts of Odisha such as Bhadrak, Balasore, Cuttack and Jagatsinghpur were widely affected by this cyclone, since gusts were recorded to be up to 175 kph there.

See also

1999 Odisha cyclone
1970 Bhola cyclone
Cyclone Hudhud
Cyclone Phailin
Cyclone Fani
Cyclone Amphan

References 

Tropical cyclones in India
1971 North Indian Ocean cyclone season
History of Odisha (1947–present)
1971 in India